Stillwellite-(Ce) is a rare-earth boro-silicate mineral with chemical formula .

Location 
It occurs as a metasomatic replacement of metamorphosed limestones in the Mary Kathleen mine, Australia and in alkalic pegmatites associated with syenite in an alkaline massif in Tajikistan. It occurs in association with allanite, garnet, uraninite in the Australian deposit; with calcite, monazite,
bastnasite, thorite, uranothorite and thorianite in the Desmont mine, Wilberforce, Ontario, Canada; and with pyrochlore, tienshanite, sogdianite, thorite, caesium kupletskite, reedmergnerite, steacyite, pectolite and quartz in the Tajikistan deposit. It has also been reported from Mont Saint-Hilaire, Quebec, Canada and from Mineville, Essex County, New York. Other occurrences include the Inagli massif, Yakutia, Russia,
around Langesundsfjord, Norway, in the Ilimaussaq intrusive complex, southern Greenland and the Vico volcano, Lazio, Italy.

Discovery 
It was named for Austrian mineralogist Frank Leslie Stillwell (1888–1963).

Chemistry Breakdown

References

Nesosilicates
Lanthanide minerals
Trigonal minerals
Minerals in space group 144